The following tables include various statistics for players on the United States men's national soccer team (featuring all caps, goals, assists and goalkeeper wins and shutouts) from the team's inception in 1916 through the January 28, 2023 game with Colombia.

Appearances
Players capped since 2022 are shown in Bold.

Goals
Active players are shown in Bold.

Assists
Active players are shown in Bold.
USSF did not begin tracking assists until the 1970s.  The top twenty are most likely accurate as no players before the mid-1980s amassed more than twenty or thirty caps.  For example, Boris Bandov, the player active before 1980 with the highest number of caps, played 33 times between 1976 and 1983, while Perry Van der Beck played 23 times between 1979 and 1985.  With the typical low scores of the times, it was unlikely any players before the 1980s assisted on more than a handful of goals.

Wins
Active players are shown in Bold.

Shutouts
Active players are shown in Bold.

See also
 List of United States men's national soccer team hat-tricks

 
Association football player non-biographical articles